Alicia Henry (born 1966) is a contemporary artist living, working and teaching in Nashville. Henry is an associate professor in the Language and Arts Department at Fisk University. Henry creates multi-media artwork that focuses on themes of the body and identity. She uses materials such as wood, fabric, paper and pigment for her creations. Henry has a Bachelor of Fine Arts from The School of the Art Institute of Chicago and a Master of Fine Arts from the School of Art at Yale University.

Work 
Henry makes layered, figurative textile wall hangings from stitched and hand-embroidered dyed cotton, leather, felt, linen, and burlap.  Her work explores themes of familial relationships, beauty, the body and identity.

Career 
Alicia Henry's work has been exhibited at various institutions including, the Whitney Museum (New York), The Drawing Center (New York), Carnegie Museum of Art (Pittsburgh), Frist Art Museum (Nashville) and the Cheekwood Museum of Art (Nashville). From January 26, 2019 to May 12, 2019, Henry had her first Canadian exhibition at The Power Plant in Toronto, Ontario. The exhibition was entitled, Witnessing and it consisted of many two-dimensional mixed media figures as well as group compositions. From May 26, 2021 to July 3, 2021, Henry had her first solo exhibition, Alicia Henry: To Whom It May Concern in the United Kingdom at Tiwani Contemporary.

Honors 

 2013: Painters & Sculptors Grant Program from The Joan Mitchell Foundation.
 2000: Guggenheim Fellowship. 
 1993: MacDowell Art Colony (Summer)
 1989-1991: Ford Foundation Fellowship

References 

1966 births
21st-century American artists
Fisk University faculty
Living people